Michael Lowry (born 20 August 1998) is an Irish rugby union player from Northern Ireland who plays fullback and out-half for United Rugby Championship and European Rugby Champions Cup side Ulster, and internationally for Ireland. Doubted early on because of his small stature, he has exceptional footwork and acceleration. Ireland coach Andy Farrell describes him as a "nightmare" to play against, praising his explosiveness and bravery.

Born in Belfast, Northern Ireland, Lowry attended Royal Belfast Academical Institution and captained the school to a Medallion Shield and three Ulster Schools' Cups in a row between 2015 and 2017, and represented Ulster at under-17, under-18 and under-19 level, as well as Ireland at under-19 level. After leaving school, he joined the Ulster academy ahead of the 2017–18 season. He debuted for Ireland under-20s in their final match of the 2018 World Rugby Under 20 Championship against Japan, which Ireland won 39–33.

He made his senior debut for Ulster on 29 September 2018, featuring off the bench in the province's 64–7 defeat at the hands of Munster. He made his European Rugby Champions Cup debut in Ulster's 24–10 win against English side Leicester Tigers in round 1 of the 2018–19 tournament on 13 October 2018. In 2018–19 he made sixteen appearances, including twelve starts, scored two tries, with 38 defenders beaten and 17 clean breaks. He was named Academy Player of the Season in the 2019 Ulster Rugby Awards. He signed his first senior contract with Ulster in February 2019, joining the senior squad ahead of the 2019–20 season. That season he made seven appearances, including 3 starts, but his season was curtailed by an ankle injury that required surgery. In 2020–21 he made 22 appearances, including 18 starts, scoring 53 points, making 159 carries with 54 defenders beaten and 15 clean breaks, and being named Man of the Match twice. He was named at fullback in the 2020–21 Pro14 Dream Team, and was invited to train with the Ireland squad for the 2021 summer internationals.

In 2021–22 he made 20 appearances, including 15 starts, and scored 22 points. He was called up to the Ireland squad for the 2022 Six Nations Championship, making his debut, and scoring two tries and providing a try assist, against Italy. He was named on the long list for EPCR European Player of the Year for his performances with Ulster in the Champions Cup, finishing the competition first in run metres with 770 and joint first for defenders beaten with 29. He was nominated for the Nevin Spence Young Player of the Year award by Rugby Players Ireland, and was named Ulster Rugby Supporters Club Player of the Year. He was called up to the Ireland squad for their 2022 tour of New Zealand.

International Tries 
As of 28 February 2022

References

External links
Ulster Rugby profile
United Rugby Championship profile

Banbridge RFC Profile

1998 births
Living people
Rugby union players from Belfast
People educated at the Royal Belfast Academical Institution
Irish rugby union players
Ulster Rugby players
Rugby union fly-halves
Rugby union fullbacks
Ireland international rugby union players